Jan Rubens (1530–1587) was a Flemish magistrate of Antwerp, best known today as the father of Peter Paul Rubens.

Family 

Rubens was born in Antwerp to an old merchant family. He was trained as a scholar and travelled to Italy where he received his diploma in Canon law in Rome in 1550. He returned north in 1557 and set up his practise in Antwerp where he married Maria Pypelinckx in 1558. On 7 May 1562 he became magistrate of Antwerp and served until 1568, when he fled to Cologne with his family, probably to avoid the Council of Troubles. His position and that of his fellow magistrates became precarious when the Duke of Alva came north to suppress the rebellion after the Beeldenstorm.
Johann VI, Count of Nassau-Dillenburg. 

In Cologne he could renew his work as a lawyer, because there were many Dutch refugees there who wanted to recover seized property they had left behind. He began to work as an advisor to Anna of Saxony and they had an affair at her home in Siegen. By the time it was discovered, she was pregnant and Rubens was arrested during a trip he took to Siegen to visit her and he was locked up in the Nassau family's castle at Dillenburg in March, 1571. His wife, who knew nothing of the affair, came to support him after he wrote to tell her he feared he would be executed. She supported him throughout his imprisonment. Thanks to her letters, Rubens was allowed to join his family in Siegen on condition of payment of 6,000 daalders bail, but he was not allowed out of Siegen or do any business work until the death of Anna of Saxony in Dresden on 18 December 1577. His illegitimate daughter with Anna of Saxony, Christina van Diez, was born 22 August 1571. In 1574 his first son with Maria Pypelinckx, Philip Rubens was born. Three years later, in 1577 Peter Paul Rubens was born.

Jan Rubens died in 1587 in Cologne. His wife wrote an epitaph in Latin that was installed on his gravestone in the St. Peter's church there. After the burial she took her children back to Antwerp where she stayed.

Literature 
 Femke Deen: Anna van Saksen. Verstoten bruid van Willem van Oranje. Atlas Contact, Amsterdam 2018. .
 Ingrun Mann: Anna of Saxony. The Scarlet Lady of Orange. Winged Hussar Publishing, Point Pleasant, New Jersey 2016. .
 Rosine De Dijn: Liebe, Last und Leidenschaft. Frauen im Leben von Rubens. DVA, Stuttgart und München 2002. (Covers both Jan and Peter Paul Rubens.)
 Hans-Joachim Böttcher: Anna Prinzessin von Sachsen 1544–1577 – Eine Lebenstragödie, Dresden 2013, .

References

1530 births
1587 deaths
People from Antwerp
Ja